Pashford Poor's Fen, Lakenheath is a  biological Site of Special Scientific Interest east of Lakenheath in Suffolk.

This diverse site has species rich meadow, hollows with fen and marshes, birch woodland, scrub and reedbeds. The invertebrate fauna is diverse, and includes the last known British site for a beetle listed on the Red Data Book of Threatened Species.

The site is private land with no public access.

References

Sites of Special Scientific Interest in Suffolk
Lakenheath